The Merzig (Saar) station is a railway station on the Saar line between Trier and Saarbrücken in the town of Merzig in the German state of Saarland. Next to the station there is a bus station and a taxi stand. The station is classified by Deutsche Bahn as a category 4 station.

Overview 
Barrier-free access is only possible to track 1, although the station is intended to be made accessible by the disabled by 2013. The Merzig-Büschfelder railway, which is operated as a heritage railway, branched off from the station to Losheim am See. Until the Second World War, the Merzig–Bettelainville railway ran via Mechern and Mondorf to Bettelainville in France. After a bridge over the Saar was blown up at the beginning of the Second World War, this line was no longer passable. During the development of the Saar for river traffic the last remnants of the bridge piers were removed. In addition to three platform tracks the station has some freight sidings and a tank loading ramp.

Entrance building

While construction was still underway from on the Saar line Saarbrücken to Merzig there was consideration of the construction of an entrance building in Merzig. The construction period can be accurately determined, as in 1884, a copy of the original design drawing was made, which has been preserved. This design of the floor plans, sections and elevations was dated April 1858 and had the signature of the architect's department. The construction of the building must have started shortly after that date.

Rail services

The station is classified by Deutsche Bahn as a category 4 station. and its fares are regulated by the Saarländischer Verkehrsverbund (SaarVV; Saarland Transport Association). The station is in fare zone 231.

Other stations in the city of Merzig

Merzig (Saar) Stadtmitte
Near the railway station there is the Merzig (Saar) Stadtmitte station, located in the inner city. This station has been in operation since 2000 and has ramps to give access for the disabled. It is served by regional trains.

Merzig-Besseringen
Merzig-Besseringen station is an older station. It is also served by regional trains only.

Notes

Railway stations in the Saarland
Buildings and structures in Merzig-Wadern
Railway stations in Germany opened in 1858